Celsus and Marcionilla were early Christian martyrs. Marcionilla was a matron, and Celsus was her little son. Together with Anastasius, Anthony, Julian and others they suffered martyrdom in Antioch during the Diocletianic Persecution.

References

External links
Saints Julian, Basilissa, Marcianilla, and Celsus at the Christian Iconography web site

302 deaths
4th-century Christian martyrs
4th-century Romans
Groups of Christian martyrs of the Roman era
Year of birth unknown
Christians martyred during the reign of Diocletian
Saints duos